Nattapon Tep-uthai (born September 2, 1991) is a Thai professional footballer who plays as a centre-back.

Honours
Phitsanulok
 Thai League 3 Northern Region: 2022–23

References

External links
 

1996 births
Living people
Nattapon Tep-uthai
Nattapon Tep-uthai
Association football defenders
Nattapon Tep-uthai
Nattapon Tep-uthai
Nattapon Tep-uthai